Presidential elections were held in Liberia in 1861. The result was a victory for incumbent President Stephen Allen Benson.

References

Liberia
1861 in Liberia
Elections in Liberia
Election and referendum articles with incomplete results